Giesecke Glacier is a glacier in Avannaata municipality in northwestern Greenland. Its outflow is split in the center by a nunatak. Through two tongues it drains the Greenland ice sheet westwards into Kangerlussuaq Icefjord.

References 

Tasiusaq Bay
Glaciers of the Upernavik Archipelago